Joshua Lane Foster (born October 10, 1824, in Canterbury, New Hampshire - d. January 29, 1900, in Dover, New Hampshire) was an architect and publisher who was the founder of the newspaper Foster's Daily Democrat in 1872. Originally he founded the newspaper as a pro-slavery alternate view to the anti-slavery North-East. The Democrat is still run today by the Foster family. It is one of the few independent newspapers left. Foster said this in the first issue of Fosters:
"We shall devote these columns mainly to the material and vital interests of Dover and vicinity. Whatever may tend to benefit this people and enhance their prosperity, will receive our warm and enthusiastic support."

Foster was trained as a carpenter, and practiced as an architect in Concord for about ten years, though this was ended by the financial turmoil surrounding the Panic of 1857. In at least 1856 he was in partnership with Fernando S. Robinson.

Extant buildings designed by Foster include the Merrimack County Courthouse (1855–57, now altered) and the Deerfield Town House (1856). Both of these buildings have been listed on the United States National Register of Historic Places, and the Deerfield Town House has also been included in the Deerfield Center Historic District.

After the panic, he purchased the Gazette of Dover in 1858, which he ran until 1861, when he briefly returned to architecture, practicing in Manchester. From 1863 he published other papers in Portsmouth, New Hampshire, New Haven, Connecticut and Manchester, New Hampshire, returning to Dover in 1872 to found the Daily Democrat.

References

Foster, Joshua L.
1824 births
1900 deaths
People from Canterbury, New Hampshire
19th-century American journalists
19th-century American male writers
Architects from New Hampshire